Mount Riddolls is a very prominent Antarctic mountain at an elevation of ,  situated directly at the head of Rudolph Glacier in the Victory Mountains of Victoria Land. Named by the Mariner Glacier geology party of the New Zealand Geological Survey Antarctic Expedition (NZGSAE) of 1966–67, for Bruce W. Riddolls, the assistant geologist with the party.

References 

Mountains of Victoria Land
Borchgrevink Coast
Three-thousanders of Antarctica